Pesar (also Romanized as Pesār and Pāsār; also known as Pāysar) is a village in Gilvan Rural District, in the Central District of Tarom County, Zanjan Province, Iran. At the 2006 census, its population was 206, in 55 families.

References 

Populated places in Tarom County